Wu Siu Hong (born October 22, 1984) is a ten-pin bowling player from Hong Kong who won the 2015 QubicaAMF Bowling World Cup.

References

External links
Bowling World of Wu Siu Hong
Brief biography of Wu Siu Hong

Hong Kong ten-pin bowling players
Living people
Year of birth missing (living people)
Asian Games medalists in bowling
Bowlers at the 2002 Asian Games
Bowlers at the 2006 Asian Games
Bowlers at the 2010 Asian Games
Bowlers at the 2014 Asian Games
Bowlers at the 2018 Asian Games
Asian Games silver medalists for Hong Kong
Asian Games bronze medalists for Hong Kong
Medalists at the 2010 Asian Games
Medalists at the 2014 Asian Games
Medalists at the 2018 Asian Games
Competitors at the 2009 World Games
Competitors at the 2017 World Games
World Games medalists in bowling
World Games silver medalists